Skyy Moore (born September 10, 2000) is an American football wide receiver for the Kansas City Chiefs of the National Football League (NFL). He played college football at Western Michigan.

High school career
Moore began his high school years at Valley High School in New Kensington, Pennsylvania. Later he finished at Shady Side Academy in Fox Chapel, Pennsylvania. He played quarterback and defensive back while in high school. He committed to the Western Michigan University to play college football.

College career
Moore was converted into a wide receiver in college despite never playing the position before. As a true freshman in 2019, Moore started 12 of 13 games and had 53 receptions for 802 yards and three touchdowns. As a sophomore in 2020, he played in five games, recording 25 receptions for 388 yards and three touchdowns. He returned as a starter in 2021. Against Northern Illinois he tied a school record with four touchdowns receptions. Moore declared for the 2022 NFL Draft following the season.

College statistics

Professional career

The Kansas City Chiefs selected Moore in the second round (54th overall) of the 2022 NFL Draft.

Moore appeared in 16 games, of which he started three, as a rookie. He finished with 22 receptions for 250 receiving yards. In the final minute of the AFC Championship Game against the Cincinnati Bengals, Moore returned a punt return 29 yards, just three yards shy of midfield, which helped set up Harrison Butker’s game-winning 45 yard field goal to secure a 23–20 victory and propel the Chiefs to Super Bowl LVII. In Super Bowl LVII, Moore scored his first career touchdown in the fourth quarter of the Chiefs 38–35 victory over the Philadelphia Eagles.

NFL career statistics

Regular season

Playoffs

References

External links
 Kansas City Chiefs bio
Western Michigan Broncos bio

2000 births
Living people
People from New Kensington, Pennsylvania
Players of American football from Pennsylvania
Sportspeople from the Pittsburgh metropolitan area
American football wide receivers
Western Michigan Broncos football players
Kansas City Chiefs players